Ebli or Ebelli or Abli may refer to:
 Ebli-ye Olya, Ardabil Province
 Ebli-ye Sofla, Ardabil Province
 Abli, East Azerbaijan

See also
 Aebli, a surname